Ang Li may refer to:
 Ang Lee (born 1954), Taiwanese-born American film director
Ang Li (pianist) (born 1985), Chinese classical pianist

See also
 Li Ang (disambiguation)